Jiří Menzel (23 February 1938 – 5 September 2020) was a Czech film director, theatre director, actor, and screenwriter. His films often combine a humanistic view of the world with sarcasm and provocative cinematography. Some of these films are adapted from works by Czech writers such as Bohumil Hrabal and Vladislav Vančura.

Early life 
Menzel was born in Prague in 1938 to Josef Menzel and Božena Jindřichová. His father Josef was a journalist, translator and children's book writer. Menzel studied directing at the Film and TV School of the Academy of Performing Arts in Prague (FAMU) in Prague. His teachers at the academy included Czech Director Otakar Vávra.

Career 
Menzel was a member of the Czech New Wave cinema in the 1960s. His first feature film, Closely Watched Trains, won the Academy Award for Best Foreign Language Film in 1967. The film was a World War II drama based on a book by Bohumil Hrabal. His film Larks on a String was filmed in 1969, but was banned by the government censors. It was finally released in 1990 after the fall of the Communist regime. The film won the Golden Bear at the 40th Berlin International Film Festival in 1990. The film was also based on a book by Bohumil Hrabal, and spoke about life in a re-education camp in Czechoslovakia under the communist rule in the 1950s.

Menzel was nominated for an Academy Award for Best Foreign Language Film again in 1986 with his dark comedy My Sweet Little Village. In 1987, he was a member of the jury at the 37th Berlin International Film Festival. In 1989 he was a member of the jury at the 16th Moscow International Film Festival. In 1995 he was a member of the jury at the 19th Moscow International Film Festival. He was awarded an IIFA Lifetime Achievement Award in November 2013. He was also awarded the French title of Knight of Arts and Letters and the Czech Lion for lifetime artistic contribution.

In the 1980s he was offered by a West German television studio to make a television series version of The Good Soldier Švejk with Rudolf Hrušínský. He didn't get the permission from the Czechoslovak government however.

His last appearance in a feature film was in the 2018 Slovak film, The Interpreter, which was based on the story of a man's interactions with an SS soldier who had executed his parents. The film was Slovakia's official entry to the Oscars.

Death 
Menzel died on 5 September 2020, aged 82, after battling a prolonged illness. He had undergone a brain surgery earlier in 2017. He is survived by his wife Olga Menzelová, and daughters, Anna Karolina and Eva Maria. Menzel's wife confirmed on 9 November 2020 that Menzel died as a result of COVID-19 pneumonia.

Filmography 
Sources:

As a Director

As an Actor 
 Strop (Short film) (1962)
 Place in the Crowd (1964)
 Obžalovaný (1964)
 Courage for Every Day (1964)
 If a Thousand Clarinets (1965)
 Pension pro svobodné pány (TV Movie) (1965)
 Pearls of the Deep (1965)
 Nobody Will Laugh (1965)
 Searching (1966)
 Volejte Martina (1966)
 Closely Watched Trains (1966)
 Flám (1966)
 Return of the Prodigal Son (1967)
 Hotel for Strangers (1967)
 Private Hurricane (1967)
 Dita Saxová (1968)
 Capricious Summer (1968)
 Crime in a Music Hall (1968)
 The Cremator (1969)
 Larks on a String (1969)

 Nevěsta (1970)
 Straw Hat (1972)
  (1972)
 Thirty Maidens and Pythagoras (1973)
 The Apple Game (1976)
 Modrá planeta (1977)
 The Woman Across the Way (1978)
 Those Wonderful Movie Cranks (1979)
 Every Wednesday (1979)
 Hra na telo (1979)
 Koportos (1980)
  (1981)
 Tale of the Little Quarter (TV Movie)(1981)
 Szívzür (1982)
 Ferat Vampire (1982)
 Švédská zápalka (TV Movie) (1982)
 Babička se zbláznila (TV Movie) (1982)
 Srdečný pozdrav ze zeměkoule (1983)
 Fandy, ó Fandy (1983)
 Sedm křížků (TV Movie)(1983)
 Felhöjáték (1984)
 Albert (TV Movie) (1985)
 Run, He Is Coming! (1987)

 Dámská jízda (TV Movie) (1988)
 Stvoření světa (TV Movie) (1989)
 Zvláštní bytosti (1990)
  (1990)
 Martha and I (1990)
 Zvonokosy (TV Movie)(1990)
 Pražský student (TV Mini-Series)(1990)
 The Elementary School (1991)
 Das lange Gespräch mit dem Vogel (TV Movie)(1992)
 The Little Apocalypse (1993)
 Všetko čo mám rád (1993)
 Joint Venture (1994)
 Revenge (1995)
  (1995)
 Too Loud a Solitude (1996)
 Truck Stop (1996)
 Drákulův švagr (TV Mini-Series) (1996)
 Franciska vasárnapjai (1997)
 Hospoda (TV Series) (1996-1997)
 All My Loved Ones (1999)
 Zimní víla (TV Movie) (1999)
 When Grandpa Loved Rita Hayworth (2000)
 The Sunken Cemetery (2002)
  (2002)
  (2004)
 Rokonok (2006)
 Teddy Bear (2007)
 A bárány utolsó megkísértése (TV Movie) (2008)
 Setkání v Praze, s vraždou (TV Movie) (2009)
 Operation Dunaj (2009)
  (TV Series) (2009)
 The Door (2012)
 (TV Series) (2012–14)
 The Interpreter (2018)

See also
 CzechMate: In Search of Jiří Menzel
 List of Czech Academy Award winners and nominees

References

External links

 
1938 births
2020 deaths
Czech theatre directors
Academy of Performing Arts in Prague alumni
Czechoslovak film directors
German-language film directors
Directors of Best Foreign Language Film Academy Award winners
Directors of Golden Bear winners
Recipients of Medal of Merit (Czech Republic)
Members of the European Academy of Sciences and Arts
Film directors from Prague
Deaths from the COVID-19 pandemic in the Czech Republic
Chevaliers of the Ordre des Arts et des Lettres